Throwing Stones is a role-playing game first published in 1995 by Gamesmiths.

Contents
Throwing Stones was sold in tubes, each tube contains seven assorted character dice, one monster die and an ordinary D6. The character dice are randomly selected from 21 different fantasy types. Included with each tube is a basic set of duelling rules allowing players to pit one character against another.

Reception
Steve Faragher reviewed Throwing Stones for Arcane magazine, rating it a 5 out of 10 overall. Faragher comments that "What a shame that such a fantastic idea is so shoddily presented. Do get hold of a set and have a look though. It might just change the way you look at roleplaying mechanics for ever."

Tom Lehmann reviewed Throwing Stones for Pyramid #17 (Jan 1996) and stated that "By removing the character sheet largely from play the game actually feels more 'diceless' than some diceless systems - a really strange result from a system based on constantly rolling dice!"

Reviews
Dragon #228 (April, 1996)

References

Role-playing games